Carlia crypta is a species of skink in the genus Carlia. It is native to Queensland in Australia.

References

Carlia
Reptiles described in 2018
Endemic fauna of Australia
Skinks of Australia
Taxa named by Sonal Singhal
Taxa named by Conrad J. Hoskin
Taxa named by Patrick J. Couper
Taxa named by Sally Potter
Taxa named by Craig Moritz